The Planter's Plantation is a 2022 Cameroonian musical drama film directed by Eystein Young. An allegory to neocolonization, the film is Cameroon's entry for Best International Feature Film at the 2023 Academy Awards.

Plot 
Set in the 1960s, Enanga a young girl goes against all odds to preserve a plantation willed to her father by a member of the colonial government.

Cast 

 Nimo Loveline as Enanga
 Nkem Owoh as Mr. Planter
 Loic Sumfor as Adamu
 Stephanie Tum as Miss Tosangeng
 Quinny Ijang as Mrs Planter
 Syriette Che as Georgiana
 Samson Vugah as Azang
 Lovert Lambe as LItumbe
 Lilian Mbeng as Matilda
 Irene Nangi as Mrs. Asong

Awards 

 The Planter's Plantation was selected as Cameroon's entry for best International Feature Film at the 95th Academy Awards.
 It won the Ecran D’or (first for a Cameroonian movie in 26 years) and two other awards at the Ecrans Noirs Festival.
It also won best actress at the same Ecrans Noir Festival 2022 for it’s lead Actress Nimo Loveline 
It won Best Lead Actress(Nimo Loveline), Best Makeup (Asanga Calton and Quinny Ijang) and Best Movie at the LFC awards 2022. 
 Best Actress at The African International Film Festival for its lead actress Nimo Loveline

References

External Links 

2022 drama films
Cameroonian drama films

2020s musical drama films